Anthony Jerome Roberts (April 15, 1955 – March 29, 1997) was an American professional basketball player for the Denver Nuggets and Washington Bullets in the National Basketball Association (NBA). He was selected in the first round as the 21st pick in the 1977 NBA draft by the Nuggets and spent five seasons playing the NBA.

Early life
Roberts was born in Chattanooga, Tennessee. He attended Riverside High School in his hometown.

Basketball career

High school
Roberts played at Riverside High School in Chattanooga and was the MVP of the Tennessee state championship team in 1972.

College
Anthony Roberts attended Oral Roberts University (ORU) from 1973–74 to 1976–77. During his four-year career, he averaged 21.7 points and 7.4 rebounds per game, including a senior season in which he averaged 34.0 points and 9.2 rebounds. He is only one of two players in National Collegiate Athletic Association (NCAA) Division I history, along with Hall of Famer Pete Maravich, to score 60 or more points in a single game versus a Division I opponent more than once. Roberts scored 66 points on February 19, 1977, against North Carolina A&T and 65 against Oregon on March 9, 1977. His total against Oregon came in the first round of the National Invitation Tournament (NIT), setting the still-standing tournament record.

In 108 career games, Roberts made 1,006 of 2,007 field goal attempts while finishing with 2,341 points and exactly 800 rebounds. He earned honorable mention All-American honors for his final three years as a Titan. Later on, Roberts would become enshrined in the ORU athletics hall of fame as a member of their inaugural class.

Professional
On June 10, 1977, Roberts was selected in the first round of that year's NBA Draft. The Denver Nuggets selected him with the 21st overall pick.

He spent his first three NBA seasons with Denver. He was eventually waived by the Nuggets and then signed by the Washington Bullets for the 1980–81 season. On September 2, 1981, the Bullets also waived Roberts, and he would not re-join another NBA team until February 16, 1984, when the Nuggets signed him to a 10-day contract. Nine days later he was signed for the rest of the season, where he would finish out his NBA career. The Nuggets waived him once again on July 25, 1984, and no other NBA team ever signed him. For his NBA career, Roberts scored 1,658 points, grabbed 837 rebounds and recorded 265 assists in 213 games.

Death
Anthony Roberts was shot and killed while arguing with two men in the parking lot outside his apartment complex on March 29, 1997. Brent Alan Kilby, 19, was charged with his murder. Kilby was sentenced to life in prison in 1998. Roberts was 41 at the time.

See also
List of NCAA Division I men's basketball players with 60 or more points in a game

References

External links
Basketball-reference statistics

1955 births
1997 deaths
American expatriate basketball people in the Philippines
American men's basketball players
Atlantic City Hi-Rollers players
Barangay Ginebra San Miguel players
Basketball players from Tennessee
Deaths by firearm in Oklahoma
Denver Nuggets draft picks
Denver Nuggets players
Male murder victims
Oral Roberts Golden Eagles men's basketball players
Philippine Basketball Association imports
Shooting guards
Small forwards
Sportspeople from Chattanooga, Tennessee
Washington Bullets players
Wyoming Wildcatters players
People murdered in Oklahoma
American murder victims